Culpa is a Latin, Spanish, and Portuguese word meaning guilt or fault.

It may also be referring to:
Criminal negligence, called culpa in several legal systems
Mea culpa, the Latin phrase for "it is my fault"
Culpa (film), a 1993 Cuban film directed by Jorge Molina
La culpa (Mexican series), a Mexican telenovela produced by Yuri Breña and Pinkye Morris for Televisa
La Culpa (Argentine film), a 1969 Argentine film directed by Kurt Land starring Libertad Leblanc and Carlos Estrada